Anísio Ferreira de Sousa was a Brazilian doctor appointed by the courts as responsible for several homicides against children in the countryside of the state of Pará. Spiritist, De Sousa was indicted based on the controversial testimony of an evangelical pastor who claimed to have witnessed a "satanic cult" at his residence. At the same event, according to the witness, De Sousa would also have said prayers to the "god of darkness". 

During the judicial process, no evidence was presented that linked De Sousa to any of the crimes of which he was accused. Also, during this period, the witness repeatedly denied, reaffirmed and altered his statements in court. Even so, based only on the testimony of this witness, the Pará court condemned De Sousa as the author of the murder of three children, in addition to the attempted murder of two others.

Crimes

Between 1989 and 1992, boys disappeared around the town of Altamira. The boys were sexually mutilated and murdered. De Sousa was sentenced to 77 years in prison.

See also
 Francisco das Chagas Rodrigues de Brito
 Satanic panic

References

Brazilian murderers of children
Brazilian people convicted of murder
Brazilian serial killers
Crimes involving Satanism or the occult
Living people
Male serial killers
People convicted of murder by Brazil
Place of birth missing (living people)
Year of birth missing (living people)